The DBAG Class 474/874 is a three-car electric multiple unit train for the Hamburg S-Bahn. The class 474 were built to replace the nearly-60-year-old class 471 trains. Some units have a pantograph (474.3) to service the 2007 opened line to Stade on an overhead catenary track.

References

External links 
 

Electric multiple units of Germany
Hamburg S-Bahn

15 kV AC multiple units
Bombardier Transportation multiple units